Mary von Bothmer (1842–1901; aged 58; also known as the Countess von Bothmer) was an English-German writer and aristocrat. She published six books during her lifetime, including German Home Life (1876).

Mary von Bothmer was born in London in 1842. Her father was John young, a British merchant. In 1856, she married German diplomat Major Count Hippolite von Bothmer (1812-1891), with whom she had two children, Alfred and Mabel. She died in 1901.

Written works

German Home Life 
Likely Von Bothmer's most popular work, German Home Life was a collection of essays on German domestic culture originally published in Fraser's Magazine. At least three edition of German Home Life were published between 1876 and 1877. A Daily News review of the book called it" the work of a lady whose extreme frankness and satirical humor amuse the reader greatly."

Novels 
 Strong Hands and Steadfast Hearts (1870)
 A Poet Hero (1870)
 Cruel as the Grave (1871)
 Aut Caesar aut Nihil (1883)

Nonfiction 
 German Home Life (1876)
 The Sovereign Ladies of Europe (1899)

References

1842 births
1901 deaths
English women novelists
British women essayists
German women essayists
19th-century English novelists
English essayists